William Wagner (1825 – 1872) was a German American physician and revolutionary who was active in 19th century Chicago politics.

Biography
Wagner was born in Karlsruhe and educated at the University of Würzburg before participating in the 1848 Revolutions alongside compatriots Carl Schurz and Franz Sigel. He escaped to the United States and settled in Chicago in 1849, where he established a medical practice. He was appointed City Doctor by Mayor John Charles Haines in 1859 and served as a Major and surgeon in the 24th Illinois Infantry Regiment from 1861 to 1863. In 1864 he was elected Coroner of Cook County on the Republican ticket and reelected in 1865. He was one of the organizers of the Cook County Hospital in 1866 and was appointed a member of the Board of Health in 1867. He married Matilda Brentano, daughter of Illinois Congressman and fellow Forty-Eighter Lorenz Brentano.

References

1825 births
1872 deaths
Cook County Coroners
German-American Forty-Eighters
German emigrants to the United States
Union Army surgeons